Gare de Molsheim is a French railway station located on the Strasbourg—Saint-Dié and Sélestat–Saverne railways. It is located within the commune of Molsheim, in the Bas-Rhin department, in northeastern France.

It is put in operation by the Compagnie des chemins de fer de l'Est (Eastern Railways Company). It is a travellers station of the Société nationale des chemins de fer français (SNCF). Belonging to the TER Grand Est network, it is only served by regional express trains.

Location
Established at an altitude of 177 meters, the former bifurcation station of Molsheim is located at the kilometric point 18.920 of the Strasbourg—Saint-Dié railway, between the stations of Dachstein and of Mutzig. It is also located at the kilometric point 33.461 of the Sélestat—Saverne railway, between the stations of Dorlisheim (still opened) and of Avolsheim (closed). The railway has been downgraded and left between the stations of Molsheim and Saverne.

History
Molsheim station began operations on 28 September 1864 by the Compagnie des chemins de fer de l'Est (Eastern Railways Company), when the latter began the operation of the vicinal line n°1 bis from Strasbourg to Barr.

The former station was destroyed in 1993.

As of 2014, the Molsheim station is a travellers station of regional interest belonging the category B, its usage being greater or equal to 100 000 travellers per year from 2010 to 2011). It includes three platforms (one on each side of the tracks and one in the middle), two shelters and an underpass.

Travellers service

Reception
Being a SNCF station, it comprises a travellers buildings, which includes counters opened every day. The station is stuffed with automatic machines allowing travellers to purchase tickets. Special layouts, equipments and services are available for disabled people. An underpass allows the crossing of the tracks and the passing from one platform to another.

Servicing
Being a travellers station of the TER Grand Est network, the Molsheim station is served by regional express trains of the following liaisons:
Strasbourg – Molsheim – Barr – Sélestat (line A 07)
Strasbourg – Saales – Saint-Dié-des-Vosges – Épinal (line A 08)
Strasbourg – Entzheim-Aéroport – Molsheim (line A 18)

Other means of transport
A parking for bicycles and several parkings for cars are fitted out around the station.

Merchandise
The Molsheim station is opened to freight services.

Pictures

References

External links

 Gare de Molsheim, TER Grand Est, SNCF

Railway stations in Bas-Rhin
Railway stations in France opened in 1864